In chemistry, water(s) of crystallization or water(s) of hydration are water molecules that are present inside crystals. Water is often incorporated in the formation of crystals from aqueous solutions. In some contexts, water of crystallization is the total mass of water in a substance at a given temperature and is mostly present in a definite (stoichiometric) ratio. Classically, "water of crystallization" refers to water that is found in the crystalline framework of a metal complex or a salt, which is not directly bonded to the metal cation.

Upon crystallization from water, or water-containing solvents, many compounds incorporate water molecules in their crystalline frameworks. Water of crystallization can generally be removed by heating a sample but the crystalline properties are often lost.

Compared to inorganic salts, proteins crystallize with large amounts of water in the crystal lattice. A water content of 50% is not uncommon for proteins.

Applications
Knowledge of hydration is essential for calculating the masses for many compounds.  The reactivity of many salt-like solids is sensitive to the presence of water.
The hydration and dehydration of salts is central to the use of phase-change materials for energy storage.

Nomenclature 
In molecular formulas water of crystallization is indicated in various ways, but is often vague. The terms hydrated compound and hydrate are generally vaguely defined.

Position in the crystal structure 

A salt with associated water of crystallization is known as a hydrate.  The structure of hydrates can be quite elaborate, because of the existence of hydrogen bonds that define polymeric structures.

Historically, the structures of many hydrates were unknown, and the dot in the formula of a hydrate was employed to specify the composition without indicating how the water is bound. Per IUPAC's recommendations, the middle dot is not surrounded by spaces when indicating a chemical adduct. Examples:
 – copper(II) sulfate pentahydrate
 – cobalt(II) chloride hexahydrate
 – tin(II) (or stannous) chloride dihydrate
For many salts, the exact bonding of the water is unimportant because the water molecules are made labile upon dissolution. In some cases, the degree of hydration can be critical to the resulting chemical properties. For example, anhydrous  is not soluble in water and is relatively useless in organometallic chemistry whereas  is versatile. Similarly, hydrated  is a poor Lewis acid and thus inactive as a catalyst for Friedel-Crafts reactions. Samples of  must therefore be protected from atmospheric moisture to preclude the formation of hydrates.

Crystals of hydrated copper(II) sulfate consist of  centers linked to  ions. Copper is surrounded by six oxygen atoms, provided by two different sulfate groups and four molecules of water. A fifth water resides elsewhere in the framework but does not bind directly to copper. In tin chloride, each Sn(II) center is pyramidal (mean  angle is 83°) being bound to two chloride ions and one water. The second water in the formula unit is hydrogen-bonded to the chloride and to the coordinated water molecule. Water of crystallization is stabilized by electrostatic attractions, consequently hydrates are common for salts that contain +2 and +3 cations as well as −2 anions. In some cases, the majority of the weight of a compound arises from water. Glauber's salt, is a white crystalline solid with  greater than 50% water by weight.

Consider the case of nickel(II) chloride hexahydrate. This species has the formula .

Analysis
The water content of most compounds can be determined with a knowledge of its formula.  An unknown sample can be determined through thermogravimetric analysis (TGA) where the sample is heated strongly, and the accurate weight of a sample is plotted against the temperature. The amount of water driven off is then divided by the molar mass of water to obtain the number of molecules of water bound to the salt.

Other solvents of crystallization
Water is particularly common solvent to be found in crystals because it is small and polar.  But all solvents can be found in some host crystals.  Water is noteworthy because it is reactive, whereas other solvents such as benzene are considered to be chemically innocuous.  Occasionally more than one solvent is found in a crystal, and often the stoichiometry is variable, reflected in the crystallographic concept of "partial occupancy." It is common and conventional for a chemist to "dry" a sample with a combination of vacuum and heat "to constant weight."

For other solvents of crystallization, analysis is conveniently accomplished by dissolving the sample in a deuterated solvent and analyzing the sample for solvent signals by NMR spectroscopy. Single crystal X-ray crystallography is often able to detect the presence of these solvents of crystallization as well. Other methods may be currently available.

Table of crystallization water in some inorganic halides

In the table below are indicated the number of molecules of water per metal in various salts.

Hydrates of metal sulfates

Transition metal sulfates form a variety of hydrates, each of which crystallizes in only one form.  The sulfate group often binds to the metal, especially for those salts with fewer than six aquo ligands.  The heptahydrates, which are often the most common salts, crystallize as monoclinic and the less common orthorhombic forms.  In the heptahydrates, one water is in the lattice and the other six are coordinated to the ferrous center.  Many of the metal sulfates occur in nature, being the result of weathering of mineral sulfides.  Many monohydrates are known.

Hydrates of metal nitrates
Transition metal nitrates form a variety of hydrates.  The nitrate anion often binds to the metal, especially for those salts with fewer than six aquo ligands.  Nitrates are uncommon in nature, so few minerals are represented here. Hydrated ferrous nitrate has not been characterized crystallographically.

Photos

See also 
Hydrate
Mineral hydration
Hydrous oxide

References 

Crystallography
Hydrates